KXYL (1240 AM) is a radio station broadcasting a News-Talk format. Licensed to Brownwood, Texas, United States, the station serves the Brownwood area. The station is currently owned by Tackett-Boazman.

References

External links
KXYL's official website

XYL
News and talk radio stations in the United States
Brown County, Texas